The Royal Borough of Kingston upon Thames is located along a stretch of the River Thames where the Hogsmill River joins the former at the town of Kingston. The Borough contains over 30 parks, 24 playgrounds, sports grounds and open spaces. There are also over 20 allotments sites which are either self-managed or run by the local council.

Much of the borough's Thames river frontage is open and accessible to the public. To the north of the town centre Canbury Gardens extends to the Lower Ham Road beyond which the Dysart open space, Royal Park Gate recreation ground and the adjacent Hawker Centre sports ground form a continuation of Ham Lands in the neighbouring London Borough of Richmond upon Thames. To the south of the town centre Queens Promenade provides open river frontage as far as Surbiton. Pedestrian access to the course of the Hogsmill River leads from its mouth at the Thames, south of the town centre, to the Hogsmill River Park and beyond. 

Other open spaces include the western half of Beverley Park and the University of London Athletic Ground and the BBC Sports Ground, Motspur Park.

Historically, the southern tip of Richmond Park fell within the borough boundaries but it was incorporated into Richmond upon Thames in 1994. 

The local authority's approach to managing its parks and open spaces are set out in its current Green Spaces strategy, 2015–2021.

The main parks and open spaces managed by Kingston upon Thames Borough Council are:

References

External links
Hogsmill Valley Walk